Pallacanestro Reggiana, also known for sponsorship reasons as UnaHotels Reggio Emilia, is an Italian professional basketball team based in Reggio Emilia, Emilia-Romagna. It plays in the LBA as of the 2022–23 season.

History

1970s
Pallacanestro Reggiana was founded on 3 September 1974 by eight friends who wanted to establish a club that would unite the basketball community of Reggio Emilia. They started to play in the regional Promozione in a white and blue jersey sponsored by Magazzini Jolly, with the season ending with a promotion to the Serie D, in which they stayed a couple of seasons before again moving up, to the Serie C. The 1977–78 preseason saw the club merge with Cestistica Tricolore and come under the ownership of Cantine Riunite who also started sponsoring the club and changed its colours to white and red in the process. During the season itself, a team composed mainly by young local players led by Gianni Codeluppi earned a promotion to the third division Serie B.

The summer again saw an organisational change as the club amalgamanated Pallacanestro Correggio, which led to the arrival of future great Orazio Rustichelli in the squad.  On the court, the team struggled, finishing the season at the last place which would have seen it relegated if not for an off-the-court reprieve. Over the next seasons the team established itself in the Serie B without managing to reach the next level, debuting promising youngster Piero Montecchi in the process.

1980s
Players such as Rustichelli (now captain), Montecchi, Fuss and Zonta helped Pallacanestro Reggiana reach the professional ranks with a win in a promotion play-off played in Udine over Necchi Pavia that opened the gates of the second division Serie A2 at the end of the 1981–82 with thousands of young supporters invading the basketball court to celebrate. 
President Enrico Prandi kept Gianni Zappi as coach and recruited Americans Roosevelt Bouie and Rudy Hackett, father of future Italian national team player Daniel Hackett. These players, along with Pino Brumatti among others under new coach Gianfranco Lombardi, would help reach the Serie A anew. They would stay three seasons in the league, reaching the title playoffs in 1985–86 but going down the next season, with Montecchi leaving for Olimpia Milano at the end of the season.

Coach Piero Pasini ensured Reggio Emilia only stayed one year away and the team stayed in the Serie A over the following seasons which saw club great Joe Bryant arrive (along with his future superstar son Kobe, who played with the youth side).

1990s
In 1990 the holding company was brought by Coopsette, with Sidis becoming the team sponsor, the ambitious club reached the Italian Cup Final Four but struggled in the second part of the league season and was relegated. The 1992–93 preseason saw the arrival of a Pallacanestro Reggiana legend in Mike Mitchell, who helped the club return to the elite.

Two seasons later the club was back in the second division, following which it decided to bank on its young academy players such as Alessandro Davoli and Gianluca Basile. Returning to the Serie A in 1997, Reggio Emilia rehired Lombardi as coach, with a young Max Menetti as assistant to guide a team containing players of the caliber of Chris Jent, Diego Pastori, Marcelo Damiao, Gianluca Basile and the evergreen Mike Mitchell. Thereafter came a successful season that saw them reach the title playoffs, downing first Milano (2–0) then in turn Treviso (3–2) winning Game 4 at the buzzer and Game 5 at PalaVerde without Mitchell to reach the semifinals where they exited at the hands of local rivals Teamsystem Bologna. The result was nevertheless enough to send the Italian outfit to a European competition for the first time, in the 1998–99 Korać Cup. Losing Mitchell (now 41) to retirement and Basile to a transfer towards Fortitudo Bologna, they reached the round of 32 in Europe and stalled at the playoff eight finals, losing against Pepsi Rimini.

2000s
Two new presidents (Elio Monducci and Chiarino Cimurri) and three different coaches could not prevent the side from falling to the second division at the end of the 1999–00 season with a 7–23 record. A nearly completely re-hauled squad coached by Franco Marcelletti reached the promotion playoffs finishing third the next season, reached the promotion finals after a 3–2 win over Pallacanestro Ragusa, but lost a heartbreaking game five to Livorno on a last second basket (81–79) at home.

Staying in the second division but now playing in the newly created LegaDue, Reggio Emilia also made changes, with Stefano Landi becoming president whilst Cimurri was named head of the LegaDue, a reorganization that also saw Alessandro Dalla Salda, the young former local press officer arising through the ranks, becoming general manager of the first team. Still coach, Marcelletti recruited Alvin Young during the NBA Summer League, with the American turning into an instant success along with compatriot Kris Clack, as the team reached the playoff finals again, after eliminating Ferrara and Scafati, but lost to Napoli, coached by a young Piero Bucchi, after five games, losing again at home (93–82).

A policy change in 2002–03, with Luca Dalmonte brought in as coach and veteran Stefano Rusconi as player, didn't yield better results, on the contrary as the team exited the promotion playoffs in the first round against Sicc Jesi, the first episode of a five years rivalry. Dalmonte lost his place to Fabrizio Frates (with Menetti assisting him), who proceeded to sign Kiwane Garris, Marco Mordente, Angelo Gigli and re-sign Alvin Young and Marcelo Damiao, with side avoiding the playoffs altogether as it finished the regular season in first place to grab the promotion race, sending Carife Ferrara and Jesi to the playoffs.

With a similar squad, the team readapted well to the first division finishing the first round in the second place in order to qualify for the Italian Cup Final Eight, where it made a shocking path to the final beating giants Milano and Roma, but eventually lost the cup 74–64 to aBenetton Treviso led by Andrea Bargnani, Marcus Goree and David Blu. An anonymous domestic season in 2005–06 (finishing eleventh) was highlighted by good results in the side's ULEB Cup campaign (eligible to Europe's second competition thanks to their cup final) where they survived the regular season and downed Ventspils in the top 16 to reach the quarterfinals, with Hemofarm Vršac led by Milenko Topić ending their run.

However, the next season ended in tears as Reggio Emilia were again relegated due to worst points difference than Air Avellino; despite Legabasket found irregularities in Treviso's Erazem Lorbek acquisition, the club was not readmitted in the First Division after a Tribunal court process only penalized Treviso record. They languished in the LegaDue in the subsequent years, exiting often in the playoffs.

2010s

The club flirted with relegation during the 2010–11 season, saving their skin with a last game win over Veroli combined with other results that saw Scafati beating Verona. In a complete turnaround in the 2011–12 season, the team led by Massimiliano Menetti (who had previously become head coach) romped to a promotion that they confirmed with a game to spare against Imola, with a 20–8 record .

The good run of form continued in the Serie A, with Reggio Emilia grabbing a sixth place before taking Luigi Datome's Roma to seven games in their quarterfinals series, losing game 7 in the Eternal City in front of 600 away fans. Qualified for another European competition, the third-tier EuroChallenge, a team spearheaded by EuroChallenge Final Four MVP Andrea Cinciarini - helped by James White among others - recorded an emphatic 79–65 victory over Triumph Lyubertsy in a packed PalaDozza Bologna arena to win their first even international title on 27 April 2014 in front of 4,000 enthusiastic fans.

On the domestic front they again reached the playoffs but were edged 2–3 by holders Montepaschi Siena in their quarterfinal series, after a controversial defeat in a game 4 played at home with Reggio Emilia 2–1 at the time marked by bad refereeing.

The next season saw the stages switched around, with Reggio Emilia jinxed by injuries underperforming in the 2014–15 EuroCup to exit the competition at the group stage with two wins in ten games. However, their league form proved more resilient as they regrouped from a March 68–118 demolition by Milano, finishing third at the end of the regular season. They would make their home advantage count in the quarterfinal series against Enel Brindisi, winning game five at home to go through.

The semifinals against Umana Reyer Venezia had the team with their backs to the wall after a 67–89 defeat in game 5, but they won the next two games to progress to a first ever final. Against Italian Cup and Supercup holders Sassari, the first five games were split between respective home victories with Reggio Emilia favoured. They forced the sixth game in Sassari to three overtimes, with Cinciarini missing two title-winning shots in the dying moments of the fourth quarter, a three from Achille Polonara followed by a steal and layup from Rimantas Kaukėnas put them 5 ahead with seconds left in the first overtime but Sassari came back to force a second overtime, it went back and forth to finish tied and bring another overtime, in which Sassari pulled away for a win.

Despite playing game 7 at home and racing into a 21–4 lead early on, Reggio Emilia could not find a response as Sassari gradually clawed back the lead before using a 12–0 fourth-quarter run to first tie then win a closely contested 73–75 game, denying the local fans the capture of a historic Serie A title.

The next season Reggio Emilia won its first Italian Supercup in Turin, beating rivals Sassari in the semifinals and Milano led by former captain Andrea Cinciarini in the final 80–68. The team managed also to reach the EuroCup Last 32, finishing third in its group with memorable victories over ALBA Berlin, MHP Riesen Ludwigsburg and Le Mans Sarthe Basket; with an 11–4 record Grissin Bon finished the first round at the top of the table for the first time in its history.

With the adds of Vladimir Golubović (January) and Derek Needham (May), the team finished the Regular Season ranked 2nd for the first time in its history, determining a rematch of the previous season Finals with 7th place Dinamo Sassari with the likes of David Logan, Josh Akognon and former NBA prospect Joe Alexander. After easily winning the first two home games led by Pietro Aradori and Amedeo Della Valle, Reggio completed the sweep by winning Game 3 in Sardinia, reaching the semifinals for the second consecutive season to meet with 3rd placed Scandone Avellino.

During the season, the Under–20 youth team had an unbeaten run at the Under–20 National Championship Finals, only to lose the Championship game 70–64 against underdogs Pallacanestro Ferrara. In the playoff semifinals, Grissin Bon won the first two home games, but Avellino came back winning Game 3 and Game 4 with a 43 points margin, tying the series 2–2. After Reggio won Game 5 and Avellino Game 6, Grissin Bon won the decisive Game 7 in front of a sold out PalaBigi 85–80, reaching the second Playoffs final of its history.

The series was marked by a disrespectful behaviour by both sets of fans: in Avellino Amedeo Della Valle and Achille Polonara were attacked with eggs by local fans, while in Game 5 Reggio's crowd repeatedly threw hygienic paper and match programmes into the court. Menetti's side lost Game 1 and Game 2 in Milan against Olimpia Milano, but managed to tied to series 2–2 by winning Game 3 and Game 4 at home. Milano eventually won Game 5 and Game 6 to win the title on Reggio's home court, where former captain Cinciarini was heavily booed.

The 2016–17 season started with the retirement of Kaukenas and the departures of Lavrinovič, Siliņš and Veremeenko. Delroy James and Sava Lešić were the first signings in the summer, while center Riccardo Cervi decided to return to the club after a season away with Avellino. 
Grissin Bon participated as title holders in the Italian Supercup Final Four, in Milan, but they were eliminated 74–72 in the semifinal by Avellino with a 3-point winning buzzer beater by Joe Ragland.

The campaign in the league started well, with a winning streak of 7 games from the 2nd to the 7th round, ended by a loss away to Varese in the 8th round, which opened a negative record of 2–6, ended by a home win over Brindisi the 6th of February 2017. However, the team managed to beat league favourites EA7 Milan in Bologna on the Boxing Day. Poor form of James and Lešić brought the management to wave them and acquire American rookie Jalen Reynolds and former 2005 NCAA champion Jawad Williams, while Rimantas Kaukenas decided to come out of retirement. Reggio beat 4th seed Capo d'Orlando in the Quarter Finals of the Italian Cup Final Eight, held in Rimini, but were knocked out in the semis by Milan. The poor form of the team continued with three consecutive losses against Trento, Cantù and Avellino that led the management to take the team to a close training camp in Cesenatico for two consecutive weeks. However the team struggled to find chemistry and, despite the arrival of Julian Wright from Trabzonspor for the playoffs, Grissin Bon were knocked out 3-0 in the first round by Avellino. 
The 2017 offseason saw captain Pietro Aradori leaving for Virtus Bologna with Achille Polonara and Andrea De Nicolao leaving the club too. The management decided to start a new project called #REstart, planning to rebuild the roster with young Italian players like Federico Mussini, Leonardo Candi and Niccoló De Vico with the add ons of Garrett Nevels, Mike Moser (later waived for physical problems), Siim-Sander Vene (never played a game due to injury, left for Varese in January) and Manuchar Markoishvili. 
However Grissin Bon had a negative 0-6 start, which had a huge impact in the missed qualification for the Final Eight despite the arrivals of Chris Wright, Pedro Llompart and James White. The club's fortune appeared to be the EuroCup, a competition where Reggio advanced to the Top16 and won its group, advancing for the first time to the quarter finals where they clashed with BC Zenit St. Petersburg

In European competitions

The club has participated in various European tournaments, winning the FIBA EuroChallenge in 2014.

Arena
Pallacanestro Reggiana has played its home games in the PalaBigi (capacity: 4,530) since 1980. Built in 1968, it is named after the city's Secretary of Sports, Giulio Bigi, and seated 3,800 until a 2007 redesign. Because it was not originally up to standard for some European-wide competitions, Reggio Emilia has had to play some of its home games in European-wide competitions, at the PalaDozza (capacity: 5,721), in Bologna. Construction was undertaken over the summer of 2015, to modernise the arena, in order for it to be able to host EuroCup games.

New locker rooms and new bath fixtures were built at PalaBigi. Then, in October 2015, Luca Vecchi, Mayor of Reggio Emilia, announced a plan to further modernise PalaBigi, increasing the arena's capacity to 4,600 seats. An option to build a new arena near Stadio Città del Tricolore, is still under consideration. During the 2015 and 2016 Italian League Playoffs, the old structure of the arena couldn't accommodate the large amount of ticket requests from the local fans, leading the club to install viewing screens in the cities' biggest squares, "Piazza Martiri del 7 Luglio", and "Piazza San Prospero".

Academy
Pallacanestro Reggiana has always invested in the youth programme in order to develop new young prospects: in fact the team that won promotion to "Serie A2" in 1982 was almost composed of players born in the town and trained in the club academy, such as Gianni Codeluppi, Piero Montecchi and Orazio Rustichelli. From 1989 to 1991 a very young Kobe Bryant played in the Academy teams while his father Joe was playing for Pallacanestro Reggiana.

Notable graduates
 1995: Gianluca Basile
 2002: Angelo Gigli 
 2004: Nicolò Melli 
 2008: Luca Campani 
 2009: Riccardo Cervi
 2010: Giovanni Pini
 2012: Ojārs Siliņš
 2013: Federico Mussini 
 2016: Artūrs Strautiņš
 2016: Alessandro Lever

Players

Current roster

Depth chart

First Team staff
{| class="wikitable"
|-
!Position
!Staff
|-
|Head coach|| Dragan Šakota
|-
|Assistant coach|| Federico Fucà
|-
|Assistant coach|| Giuseppe Mangone
|-
|Physical Trainer|| Salvatore Poma
|-
|Club manager|| Michele Talamazzi

Personnel

Season by season

Honours

Domestic competitions
LegaDue
Champions: 2004, 2012
Serie A
Runners-up: 2015, 2016
Italian Supercup
Winners: 2015
Italian Cup
Runners-up: 2005
Under 20 Italian Championship
Winners: 2003
Runners-up: 2016
Under 21 Italian Championship
Winners: 2007

European competitions
EuroChallenge
Winners: 2014
FIBA Europe Cup
Runners-up: 2022

Individual awards
Awards earned by members of Pallacanestro Reggiana whilst at the club:
Serie A
Season Top Scorer: Mike Mitchell (1997-98) Scoring Average 24.08
Season Top Scorer: Donell Taylor (2012–13) Scoring Average 19.10
Best Executive: Alessandro Dalla Salda (2012–13)
LegaDue
Best Coach (2): Fabrizio Frates (2003–04), Massimiliano Menetti (2011–12)
EuroChallenge
Final Four MVP: Andrea Cinciarini (2014)

Notable players

Hall of Fame
The following players were inducted into the club's hall of fame:

 Piero Montecchi 5 seasons: '82–'87
 Gianluca Basile 4 seasons: '95–'99
 Joe Bryant 2 seasons: '89–'91
 Mike Mitchell 7 seasons: '92–'99
 Bob Morse 2 seasons: '84–'86
 Pino Brumatti 4 seasons: '83–'87

Other notable players

2010's
 Simone Fontecchio 1 season: '19–'20
 Gal Mekel 1 season: '19–'20
 Stefano Gentile 2 seasons: '15-'17
 Andrea De Nicolao 2 seasons: '15-'17
 Pietro Aradori 2 seasons: '15–'17
 Vladimir Veremeenko 1 season: '19–'20
 Achille Polonara 3 seasons: '14–'17
 Darjuš Lavrinovič 2 seasons: '14–'16
 Kšyštof Lavrinovič   season: '14
 Amedeo Della Valle   seasons: '14–'18
 Rimantas Kaukėnas 3 seasons: '13–'16
  Ariel Filloy 1 season: '13–'14
 James White 2 season: '13–'14, '17–'18
 Andrea Cinciarini 5 seasons: '12–'15, '21-present
  Greg Brunner 2 seasons: '12–'14
 Michele Antonutti 2 seasons: '12–'14
 Donell Taylor  seasons: '11–'13, '14
 Troy Bell  seasons: '11, '13–'14
 Dawan Robinson  seasons: '11, '12–'13
 Ojārs Siliņš 6 seasons: '10–'16
 Stephen Thompson Jr. 

 Donatas Slanina 4 seasons: '09–'13
 Nicolò Melli 3 seasons: '07–'10
 Ricky Minard 2 seasons: '05–'07
 Terrell McIntyre 1 season: '05–'06
 Angelo Gigli  seasons: '03–'06, '14
 Kiwane Garris 2 seasons: '03–'05
 Stefano Rusconi 1 season: '02–'03
 Alvin Young 5 seasons: '01–'04, '07–'09
 Marco Mordente 4 seasons: '00–'01, '02–'05
 Kris Clack 2 seasons: '00–'02
 Sandro Dell'Agnello 2 seasons: '00–'02
 Teemu Rannikko 2 seasons: '00–'02

1990's
 Roberto Chiacig  seasons: '99, 11'–12'
 Boris Gorenc  season: '99–'00
 Tracy Moore 2 seasons: '98–'00
 Yann Bonato 1 season: '98–'99
 Marcelo Damião 4 seasons: '97–'98, '99–'00, '03–'05
 Chris Jent 2 seasons: '97–'98, '00–'01
  Pace Mannion 1 season: '96–'97
 Tony Brown 2 seasons: '92–'94
 Vincent Askew  season: '92
 Tony Massenburg  season: '92
  Georgi Glouchkov 1 season: '90–'91

1980's
 Joe Bryant 2 seasons: 89'–90', 90'–91'
 Kannard Johnson 1 season: '88–'89
 Roosevelt Bouie 7 seasons: '82–'89
 Rudy Hackett 2 seasons: '82–'84

Head coaches 
 1974-1975:  Marzio D’Arrigo 
 1975-1978:  Giuseppe Ferretti
 1978-1981:  Raimondo Vecchi
 1981-1983:  Gianni Zappi
 1983-1986:  Dado Lombardi 
 1986-1987:  Cesare Pancotto 
 1987:  Leandro Ergelini 
 1987-1988:  Piero Pasini 
 1988:  Massimo Grisanti 
 1989-1991:  Joe Isaac 
 1991-1992:  Massimo Grisanti 
 1992-1994:  Virginio Bernardi 
 1994-1995:  Zare Markovski 
 1995-1997:  Giordano Consolini 
 1997-2000:  Dado Lombardi 
 2000-2002:  Franco Marcelletti 
 2002-2003:  Luca Dalmonte
 2003-2006:  Fabrizio Frates 
 2006:  Renato Pasquali 
 2006-07:  Max Menetti 
 2007-2009:  Franco Marcelletti 
 2009-2010:  Alessandro Ramagli 
 2010:  Piero Coen 
 2010-11:  Alessandro Finelli 
 2011:  Fabrizio Frates
 2011-2018:  Max Menetti
 2018–2019:  Devis Cagnardi
 2019:  Stefano Pillastrini
 2019–2020:  Maurizio Buscaglia
 2020-2021:  Antimo Martino
 2021–2022:  Attilio Caja
 2022:  Max Menetti
 2022–present:  Dragan Šakota

Sponsorship names
Throughout the years, due to sponsorship deals, the club has been known as:

Magazzini Jolly Reggio Emilia: (1974–1977)
Cantine Riunite Reggio Emilia: (1977–1990)
Sidis Reggio Emilia: (1990–1993)
Ceramica Campeginese Reggio Emilia: (1993–1994)
Metasystem Reggio Emilia: (1994–1995)
Pallacanestro Reggiana: (1995–1996)
CFM Reggio Emilia: (1996–1998)
Zucchetti Reggio Emilia: (1998–1999)
Bipop Carire Reggio Emilia: (1999–2007)
Landi Renzo [European competition]: (2005–06)
Trenkwalder Reggio Emilia: (2007–2013)
Grissin Bon Reggio Emilia: (2013–2020)
UNAHOTELS Reggio Emilia: (2020–current)

Notes

References

External links
 
EuroCup profile Retrieved 1 September 2015
Serie A profile  Retrieved 1 September 2015
FIBA Europe profile Retrieved 1 September 2015

1974 establishments in Italy
Basketball teams established in 1974
Basketball teams in Emilia-Romagna